The diamonitirion is a special written permit required for entry to Mount Athos that is compulsory for all visitors.

The diamonitirion is granted only to men, since women are forbidden from entering Mount Athos. Pilgrim applications are made at the Mount Athos Pilgrims' Bureau in Thessaloniki, Greece, while visitors from holy orders (Orthodox monks and clerics) must also seek written permission (evlogia) from the Ecumenical Patriarchate of Constantinople in Istanbul. Applicants must then visit the Mount Athos Pilgrims' Bureau in Ouranoupoli, usually on the morning of the departure by boat for Mount Athos, to receive the actual diamonitirion. Pilgrims must always keep their diamonitirion with them at all times during their visit to Mount Athos.

Types
There are two types of diamonitirions:

The genikon diamonitirion or "general permit" is issued by the Pilgrims' Bureau (officially known as the Holy Executive οf the Holy Mount Athos - Pilgrims' Bureau) in Thessaloniki, located on Egnatia Street near the Arch of Galerius. This permit gives the right to stay in Mount Athos for 3 nights (4 days including the day of departure). It can be extended in Karyes if necessary, generally for an additional two nights. This permit is limited to 100 Orthodox visitors and 10 non-Orthodox visitors per day. Pilgrims can apply up to 6 months in advance. High season is typically during July, August, Christmas, Great Lent, and Easter, and slots may fill up a few months in advance.
The idikon diamonitirion or "individual permit" is issued by the monastery itself for a period usually from 4 days to 1 year, officially with the right to reside only in the monastery indicated in the invitation (although in practice, a pilgrim with this permission may actually also stay overnight in any other monastery).

References

External links

Visit Mount Athos

Mount Athos
International travel documents